Somali coup d'état may refer to:

1978 Somali coup d'état attempt
1969 Somali coup d'état